In geometry, the icositruncated dodecadodecahedron or icosidodecatruncated icosidodecahedron is a nonconvex uniform polyhedron, indexed as U45.

Convex hull 

Its convex hull is a nonuniform truncated icosidodecahedron.

Cartesian coordinates 
Cartesian coordinates for the vertices of an icositruncated dodecadodecahedron are all the even permutations of

 (±(2−1/τ), ±1, ±(2+τ))
 (±1, ±1/τ2, ±(3τ−1))
 (±2, ±2/τ, ±2τ)
 (±3, ±1/τ2, ±τ2)
 (±τ2, ±1, ±(3τ−2))

where τ = (1+)/2 is the golden ratio (sometimes written φ).

Related polyhedra

Tridyakis icosahedron

The tridyakis icosahedron is the dual polyhedron of the icositruncated dodecadodecahedron. It has 44 vertices, 180 edges, and 120 scalene triangular faces.

See also
 Catalan solid Duals to convex uniform polyhedra
 Uniform polyhedra
 List of uniform polyhedra

References
 Photo on page 96, Dorman Luke construction and stellation pattern on page 97.

External links 
 

Uniform polyhedra